Antonysamy Savarimuthu is a Bishop of the Catholic Diocese of Palayamkottai, Tamil Nadu, India. He was born on 8 December 1960 in Vadaku Vandalam of the Diocese of Palayamkottai.

Formation and Education

He studied his initiation course in St Peter's Minor Seminary, Madurai. He pursued his philosophical and theological formation in St Peter's Pontifical Seminary, Bangalore from 1979 to 1987. He was ordained a priest on 26 April 1987. He also holds a Licentiate and Doctorate in Canon Law from Institut Catholique de Paris from 1992 to 2000.

Ministry

After his sacerdotal ordination, he served Bishop Iruthayaraj as his secretary from 1987 to 1989. He served as a formator and lecturer in St Peter's Seminary from 1997-2001. He was appointed Rector in Christ Hall Seminary, Madurai (2004–2011). He served the diocese in various capacities: Vicar General (2004–2009) Parish Priest of Infant Jesus Shrine, Shantinagar (2005–2009), Rector of St Mary's Minor Seminary and the Vocation Promoter of the Diocese, and Rector of the shrine of San Guida. From 2011, he was a professor of Canon Law in St Peter's Pontifical Institute, Bangalore and was the Dean of the Faculty of Canon Law till the announcement as Bishop-Elect of the Diocese of Palayamkottai.

Bishop Elect

Pope Francis appointed him the third Bishop of the Diocese of Palayamkottai on 20 November 2019 and his episcopal consecration took place on 15 December 2019.

References

Living people
1960 births
20th-century Indian Roman Catholic priests
Institut Catholique de Paris alumni
21st-century Roman Catholic bishops in India